Sleepless is the sixth solo album by Peter Wolf, released in 2002. The album ranked 427 on Rolling Stone's 500 Greatest Albums of All Time.

Wolf told The Boston Phoenix in 2002 that he had a "pessimistic sensibility" in his approach to making the album with no great expectations about the album’s commercial viability after watching his previous record "die on the vine" due to his then label (along with several others) being "swallowed up in (a) big corporate conglomerate". He explained that he "made this record figuring, ‘I have a lot of different interests, a lot of different roots, and this is the painting I feel like painting right now.’ And what’s the single? There is no single. I wasn’t thinking of hooks."

The album features notable guest appearances by Mick Jagger, Keith Richards, Wolf's former J. Geils bandmate, Magic Dick, and Steve Earle.

Track listing
"Growin' Pain" (Angelo Petraglia, Wolf) – 3:12
"Nothin' but the Wheel" (John Scott Sherrill) – 4:34
"A Lot of Good Ones Gone" (Will Jennings, Wolf) – 3:33
"Never Like This Before" (Isaac Hayes, Booker T. Jones, David Porter) – 3:21
"Run Silent, Run Deep" (Timothy S. Mayer, Wolf) – 4:13
"Homework" (Dave Clark, Al Perkins, Otis Rush) – 2:39
"Five O'Clock Angel" (Jennings, Wolf) – 3:00
"Hey Jordan" (Jennings, Wolf) – 3:03
"Too Close Together" (Sonny Boy Williamson) – 2:24
"Some Things You Don't Want to Know" (Jennings, Wolf) – 2:31
"Oh Marianne" (Jennings, Wolf) – 4:19
"Sleepless" (Jennings, Wolf) – 4:05

Personnel

Peter Wolf – vocals 
Larry "Rock" Campbell – fiddle, guitar, mandolin, pedal steel, backing vocals, resonator guitar, baritone guitar 
Crispin Cioe – alto saxophone 
John Conte – electric bass 
Charley Drayton – drums 
Cornell Dupree – electric guitar, soloist 
Ada Dyer – backing vocals 
Steve Earle – vocals 
Rob Eaton – backing vocals 
Laurence Etkin – trumpet 
Robert Funk – tenor trombone 
Tony Garnier – acoustic bass 
Milt Grayson – bass vocals 
Arno Hecht – tenor saxophone 
Mick Jagger – harmonica, vocals 
Stuart Kimball – electric guitar 
Duke Levine – guitar, mandolin, electric guitar, soloist 
Magic Dick – harmonica 
Warren McRae – electric bass 
Sammy Merendino – percussion 
Brian Mitchell – accordion 
Paul Ossola – electric bass, acoustic bass 
Shawn Pelton – drums 
Angelo Petraglia – acoustic guitar 
Dan Reiser – drums 
Keith Richards – electric guitar, vocals 
Catherine Russell – backing vocals 
Kevin Shurtleff – percussion, drums 
Tom West – organ 
Kenny White – organ, acoustic guitar, piano, backing vocals, Wurlitzer 
Teresa Williams – backing vocals 
Cire Jones – backing vocals 
Fred Griffith – backing vocals

Production

Peter Wolf - producer
Kenny White - producer
Rob Eaton - engineer
Chris Rival - engineer
Tom Waltz - engineer
 Dave Westner - engineer
Ben Wisch - engineer
Steve Mazur - assistant engineer
Jacques Obadia - assistant engineer
Rob Eaton - mixing
Phil Greene - mixing
Dave Westner - mixing
Ben Wisch - mixing
Bob Ludwig - mastering
Rob Eaton, Dave Westner - recording
Karen Rome - project coordinator
Jill Dell'Abate - session coordinator
Frank Olinsky - design
Joe Greene - photography
Frank Olinsky - cover photo

Charts
Album – Billboard (United States)

References

Peter Wolf albums
2002 albums
Artemis Records albums